Isaac Myers (January 13, 1835 – January 26, 1891) was a pioneering African American trade unionist, a co-operative organizer and  a caulker from Baltimore, Maryland.

Myers was born as a free black, though Maryland was a slave state. Since the state of Maryland did not offer public education for African American youth, Myers had to acquire his early education from a private day school run by Rev. John Fortie. At the age of 16 he began work as a caulker, sealing seams in ships. In the 1850s Myers married Emma V. Morgan, who died in 1868. With her they had three children, including political activist George A. Myers. He later married Sarah E. Deaver. In 1860, Myers left caulking to work in a grocery business leading him to set up a short lived co-operative grocery in 1864. He returned to caulking in 1865.

After the American Civil War competition for jobs led to strikes and protests by white workers, forcing over 1000 black caulkers to lose their jobs. Myers proposed the workers collectively pool resources and form a co-operative shipyard and railway, the Chesapeake Marine Railway and Dry Dock Company, to provide themselves with employment. The co-operative, opening in February 1866, was initially a great success, employing over 300 black workers.

Myers and others also established the Colored Caulkers Trade Union Society in 1868, to which he was elected president. The National Labor Union took interest, inviting the Colored Caulkers Trade Union Society to their annual convention. The move was significant for what had previously been an all-white union, but black workers continued to face opposition to membership. In response the Colored National Labor Union was established in 1869, with Myers as president. He was succeeded in 1872 as President by Frederick Douglass.

Following his departure from the CFNL Myer's continued working and contributing to the labor movement. He became increasingly involved in the Republican Party during the 1870s. He worked as both a Customs Service agent and as a postal service agent under President Ulysses S. Grant's abolitionist Postmaster General John Creswell. He was the first known African American  postal inspector, serving from 1870 until 1879, after which he returned to operate a coal yard in Baltimore. "Myer's also organized and became President of the Maryland Colored State Industrial Fair Association, the Colored Business Men's Association of Baltimore, the Colored Building and Loan Association, and the Aged Ministers Home of the A.M.E. Church".

The Frederick Douglass - Isaac Myers Maritime Park in Baltimore is named after Myers.

References 

American trade union leaders
African-American trade unionists
People from Baltimore
American cooperative organizers
1835 births
1891 deaths
Trade unionists from Maryland